The 18029/18030 Shalimar–Lokmanya Tilak Terminus Express is an express train belonging to Indian Railways that runs between Shalimar (Kolkata) and Lokmanya Tilak Terminus (Mumbai) in India.

It operates as train number 18029 from Lokmanya Tilak Terminus to Shalimar (Kolkata) and as train number 18030 in the reverse direction.

Coaches

The 18029/18030 Shalimar Lokmanya Tilak Terminus Express presently has 1 AC 2 tier, 1 AC 3 tier, 13 Sleeper Class & 4 General Unreserved coaches. In addition, it carries up to 4 High Capacity Parcel Vans.

As with most train services in India, coach composition may be amended at the discretion of Indian Railways depending on demand.

Service

The 18029 Lokmanya Tilak Terminus Shalimar Express covers the distance of 1950 kilometres in 38 hours 20 mins (50.87 km/hr) & 1951 kilometres in 37 hours 50 mins (51.57 km/hr) as 18030 Shalimar Lokmanya Tilak Terminus Express.

As the average speed of the train is below 55 km/hr, as per Indian Railways rules, its fare does not include a Superfast surcharge.

Gallery

Traction

Prior to DC–AC conversion, 2 locomotives would haul the train. A WCAM 3 from the Kalyan shed hauls the train between Lokmanya Tilak Terminus &  after which a Howrah-based WAP-4 takes over for the remainder of the journey.

With Central Railway progressively moving towards a complete changeover from DC to AC traction, it has recently started being hauled end to end by a -based WAP-4 locomotive.

Time Table

18029 Lokmanya Tilak Terminus Shalimar Express leaves Lokmanya Tilak Terminus on a daily basis at 21:55 hrs IST and reaches Kolkata Shalimar at 12:15 hrs IST on the  3rd day.

18030 Shalimar Lokmanya Tilak Terminus Express leaves Kolkata Shalima] on a daily basis at 15:00 hrs IST and reaches Lokmanya Tilak Terminus at 04:50 hrs IST on the 3rd day.

External links

References 

Transport in Mumbai
Rail transport in Howrah
Express trains in India
Rail transport in Maharashtra
Rail transport in Chhattisgarh
Rail transport in Jharkhand
Rail transport in West Bengal